Miss Universo Chile 2011, the 48th Miss Universe Chile pageant, was the return of Chile to the Miss Universe pageant after 4 years of absence. The winner, Vanessa Ceruti, was crowned at the Enjoy Santiago, Casino & Resort on July 13, 2011 and she represented her country in Miss Universe 2011 in São Paulo, Brazil on September 12, 2011.

Final results

Special awards

 Modelo Revelación - Vanessa Cerutti (Magallanes y Antártica Chilena)
 Rostro Juvenil - María Jesús Matthei (Aysén)

Delegates

Jury

 Ximena Navarrete, Miss Universe 2010
 Ana María Cummins, Director Foundation Alter Ego
 Rubén Campos, Fashion Designer
 Renata Ruiz, Miss Universo Chile 2005
 Carolina De Moras, TV Presenter, Model
 Alvaro Rudolphy, Actor
 Eva Gómez, TV Presenter
 Vanessa Miller, Actress
 Pedro Frugone, Musician
 José Zarhi, Plastic Surgeon
 Dario Sepe

Notes

 The pageant is being organized by Luciano Marrochino, Enjoy Casino & Resort and Camilo Valdivia.
 María Jesús Matthei, the 1st Runner-up of the contest, participated again in 2013, winning the competition and representing Chile in Miss Universe 2013.

References

External links
 Official Miss Universo Chile

Miss Universo Chile
2011 in Chile
2011 beauty pageants